The table below lists the reasons delivered from the bench by the Supreme Court of Canada during 2006. A total of 59 judgments were published. The table illustrates what reasons were filed by each justice in each case, and which justices joined each reason. This list, however, does not include reasons on motions.

The Globe and Mail remarked that this year was the lowest number of judgments released in at least 25 years. It was noted that this appears to be a part of a similar trend seen in the US Supreme Court and House of Lords.

Reasons

Justices of the Supreme Court

Notes

External links
 2006 decisions: CanLII LexUM

Reasons Of The Supreme Court Of Canada, 2006
2006